The Great Mosque of Tirana or Namazgah Mosque is a mosque which is currently being built in Tirana, Albania. When completed, it will be the largest mosque in the Balkans.

History 
After the fall of communism in Albania, in 1991, Albanian Muslims often complained about being discriminated against.  While two cathedrals (Catholic and Eastern Orthodox) were built, as of 2016 Muslims in Albania still had no central mosque and had to pray in the streets. In 1992, then president, Sali Berisha, laid the first stone of a mosque to be constructed near Namazgja square, close to the parliament. Construction was delayed after the speaker of parliament, Pjetër Arbnori contested the plans.

The decision of building the mosque was taken in 2010, by then mayor of Tirana, Edi Rama.

The building of the mosque is considered necessary because there are only 8 mosques in the city, down from 28 in 1967. During Islamic holidays, the Skanderbeg Square is filled with Muslim worshipers, because the Ottoman-era Ethem Bey mosque, currently Tirana's principal mosque, has a capacity of only 60 persons. Rain makes Friday sermons impossible.

The mosque will have four minarets, each 50 meters high, while the central dome will have a height of 30 meters. The first floor of the mosque will include a cultural center and other facilities. The mosque is being constructed on a 10,000-square-meter parcel of land near Albania's parliament building and will have the capacity for up to 4,500 people to pray at one time within the mosque.

The financing for the mosque's construction comes from the main state-run Turkish Muslim organisation Diyanet. In 2015, Turkish  president Recep Tayyip Erdoğan visited Albania for the inauguration ceremony of the mosque.

See also
 Islam in Albania

References

External links 

 Official Website (Albanian and English)

Proposed mosques
Mosques in Tirana
21st-century mosques
Albania–Turkey relations
Tirana
Mosque buildings with domes